Thomas Walwyn may refer to:

Thomas Walwyn (died 1444), MP for Herefordshire (UK Parliament constituency) in 1395
Thomas Walwyn (died 1415), MP for Herefordshire (UK Parliament constituency) 1397-1404